Thundering Thompson is a 1929 American silent Western film directed by Ben F. Wilson.

Cast 
 Cheyenne Bill as Deputy Sheriff 'Thundering' Thompson
 Neva Gerber as Maria Valerian
 Al Ferguson as Bill Edwards
 Cliff Lyons as Efe
 Ed La Niece as George Morgan

External links 
 
 

1929 films
1929 Western (genre) films
1920s English-language films
American black-and-white films
Silent American Western (genre) films
Films directed by Ben F. Wilson
1920s American films